Le Parc de la Feyssine is a park in Lyon, France.

Situated between the Rhone river and the college campus of La Doua in Villeurbanne and to the north of Lyon, Parc de la Feyssine was created on former marshlands to serve as a passage from Parc de la Tête d'or to the  Grand Parc de Miribel-Jonage. Opened in 2002, it is wooded over 50% of its surface, and has trails for walking, mountain biking and running, including a circular path and the "chemin hectomètrique", a path with informational exhibits every 100m.

See also
 Berges du Rhône
 Parks in Lyon

References

External links

Parks in Lyon
Villeurbanne